Crailo can refer to:
Fort Crailo, a fort in Rensselaer, New York 
Crailo, Huizen, a village in the Netherlands in the municipality of Huizen